Batagoda is a village in the Kalutara district of Sri Lanka. It is fourteen kilometers away from the city of Kalutara. The temple of Batagoda, Bhodimalu Viharaya is one of ancient places of this village and it situated in middle of the village.  Its population is about one thousand five hundred. The village itself has an agricultural background.

Populated places in Kalutara District